Hitra–Frøya is a Norwegian newspaper, published in Hitra, Norway. The newspaper was founded in 1974 as Hitra-Nytt, and was called Hitra–Frøya from 1985. Editor-in-chief from 2008 is Bjørn Rønningen.

References

1974 establishments in Norway
Newspapers published in Norway
Norwegian-language newspapers
Polaris Media
Publications established in 1974
Mass media in Trøndelag